St. George's Anglican Church is an historic Carpenter Gothic style Anglican church building located at 216 Main Street in Parrsboro, Nova Scotia, Canada.

History 

Rev. Thomas Shreve, was the first rector of St. George's parish and stayed for 15 years (1787–1803).  The Parish of St. Georges was established by Order in Council in 1786 and at one time had seven churches along the shore from Apple River to Truro.

Built around 1865, the current church's steep pitched roof, corner belfry with spire, and lancet windows are typical of Carpenter Gothic churches. St. George's is part of the Parrsboro/Port Greville Parish in the Anglican Diocese of Nova Scotia and Prince Edward Island.  The Rev'd Tory Byrne is the rector. The present building is the third the church has had since its founding in 1786. St. George's is a municipally registered heritage site as designated by the City of Parrsboro on September 28, 1987.

References

Anglican church buildings in Nova Scotia
19th-century Anglican church buildings in Canada
Carpenter Gothic church buildings in Nova Scotia
Heritage sites in Nova Scotia
Buildings and structures in Cumberland County, Nova Scotia
Tourist attractions in Cumberland County, Nova Scotia
1860s establishments in Nova Scotia